Martin Mejstřík (born 30 May 1962) is a Czech politician and human rights activist.

Biography
Mejstřík is notable for his role as a student leader during the Velvet Revolution that led to the ousting of the Communist regime in Czechoslovakia in November 1989. He served as a Senator in the Senate of the Parliament of the Czech Republic from 2002 to 2008, representing Prague 1 as an independent, and was a member of the Senate Committee on Education, Science, Culture, Human Rights and Petitions.

Mejstřík is a founding signatory of the Prague Declaration on European Conscience and Communism (and the co-organizer, with Jana Hybášková, of its preceding conference) and the Declaration on Crimes of Communism. He was also one of the politicians proposing the creation of the Institute for the Study of Totalitarian Regimes. In 2007, he proposed a ban on "communist and all totalitarian propaganda and symbols".

References

External links

1962 births
Living people
Politicians from Kolín
Czech democracy activists
Czech human rights activists
Members of the Senate of the Czech Republic
Czech anti-communists
Academy of Performing Arts in Prague alumni